Elm bark beetle is a common name for several insects and may refer to:

Hylurgopinus rufipes, native to North America
Scolytus multistriatus, native to Europe and introduced to North America
Scolytus schevyrewi, native to Asia and introduced to North America

Insect common names